Greg McNamara (1950–1997) was an Australian Boxer. He was born in Tamworth, New South Wales and was Australian Light-Heavyweight Boxing Champion.

External links 
 Greg McNamara

1950 births
1997 deaths
People from Tamworth, New South Wales
Australian male boxers
Light-heavyweight boxers
Sportsmen from New South Wales